Kamareh-ye Hashem Beg (also Romanized as Kamareh-ye Hāshem Beg) is a village in Gol Gol Rural District, in the Central District of Kuhdasht County, Lorestan Province, Iran. At the 2006 census, its population was 89, in 15 families.

References 

Towns and villages in Kuhdasht County